Minervarya asmati (Bangladeshi cricket frog) is a species of frogs found in the Chittagong and Dhaka, Bangladesh. Its type locality is on the University of Chittagong campus. It was described by Mohammad Sajid Ali Howlader in 2011.

Description
Its basic colour varies from olive green to greenish brown. Males have a butterfly shaped vocal marking.

Behaviour
The species breeds in temporary pools. Male Minervarya asmati call for females; females prefer choruses rather than single or few calling males.

References

asmati
Endemic fauna of Bangladesh
Amphibians of Bangladesh
Frogs of Asia
Amphibians described in 2011